Fatehnagar railway station is a railway station in Udaipur district, Rajasthan, India. Its code is FAN. It serves Fatehnagar town. The station consists of a pair of platforms. Passenger, Express, and Superfast trains halt here.

Trains

The following trains halt at Fatehnagar railway station in both directions:

 Bandra Terminus–Udaipur Express
 Bandra Terminus–Udaipur Superfast Express
 Veer Bhumi Chittaurgarh Express
 Ratlam–Udaipur City Express
 Udaipur City–Jaipur Intercity Express
 Udaipur City–Haridwar Express

References

Railway stations in Udaipur district
Ajmer railway division